Melaleuca diosmifolia is a plant in the myrtle family, Myrtaceae and is endemic to the south-west of Western Australia. It has also become naturalised in Victoria (Australia) Australia. It is unusual for its genus in that the flowers are green, which partly accounts for its popularity as a garden plant. It is only distantly related to Melaleuca diosmatifolia although its species name has a similar etymology.

Description

The flowers are arranged in heads near the ends of branches which continue to grow after flowering and sometimes in the upper leaf axils. The flowers are bright lime-green or pale yellow-green and appear in spring and early summer. The stamens are arranged in bundles of five around the flower, with 3 to 5 stamens in each bundle.

Taxonomy and naming
Melaleuca diosmifolia was first formally described in 1807 by Henry Cranke Andrews in The Botanist's Repository for New, and Rare Plants. The specific epithet (diosmifolia) is a reference to the similarity of the leaves of this species and those of Diosma.

Distribution and habitat
Melaleuca diosmifolia occurs near the coast of Western Australia between Cape Riche and Albany in the Esperance Plains, Jarrah Forest and Warren biogeographic regions. It grows in shallow, sandy soils in granite outcrops.
This species has also become naturalised in the Otway Ranges district of Victoria, where it is considered an environmental weed.

Conservation status
Melaleuca diosmifolia is listed as "not threatened" by the Government of Western Australia Department of Parks and Wildlife.

Use in horticulture
This species is well known in cultivation. It is a hardy and adaptable species in most soils and situations except that it will not survive frosts. It can be pruned to make a useful and attractive screen or hedge.

References

diosmifolia
Myrtales of Australia
Plants described in 1807
Endemic flora of Western Australia
Taxa named by Henry Cranke Andrews